The Krucze Mountains (German: Rabengebirge ) are the Eastern part of the Stone Mountains, which belong to the Central Sudetes on the border of the Czech Republic and Poland. To the West and North-Western part the mountain range borders the Lubawska Plateau and the Karkonosze Mountains, to the North-Eastern part they border the mountain range Czarny Las, from the East they border the sediment basin Kotlina Krzeszowska and the Zawory mountain range and to the South the mountain range borders the Czech part of the Stołowe Mountains. To the Southern ridge of mountain range is the Polish-Czech border. The border crossing for cars is in Lubawka and for tourists is in Okrzeszyn.

Specification
The mountain range stretches North to South, which is irregular for the Sudetes Mountains, this is due to their geological build. To the very North of the mountain range is Kościelna with a height of 513 metres, which is on the outskirts of the settlement of Kamienna Góra. The most important highest peaks in the Northern part of the mountain range are: Długosz at 612 metres, Anielska Góra at 651 metres, Czarnogóra at 621 metres, Kierz at 662 metres, Skowroniec at 581 metres,  Pustelnia at 683 metres,  Święta Góra at 701 metres,  Krucza Skała at 681 metres, Polska Góra at 792 metres, Szeroka at 844 metres, Głazica at 798 metres, Wiązowa at 800 metres, Jaworowa at 786 metres,  Owcza Głowa at 753 metres,  Końska at 813 metres, Kobyla Góra at 758 metres, Bogoria at 645 metres, Jański Wierch at 697 metres. On the Czech side of the mountain range, from the West of the border ridge is Královecký Špičák, the highest peak of the Krucze Mountains and Mravenčí vrch at 836 metres.

The Jańskiego Wierchu Massif is separated from the Krucze Mountains by the Szkła Valley, and according to Czech geographers the Jestřebí hory mountain range.

Settlements

On the Polish side of the mountain range
Błażejów, Błażkowa, Janiszów, Kamienna Góra, Lipienica, Lubawka, Okrzeszyn, Przedwojów and Uniemyśl.

On the Czech side of the mountain range
Bečkov, Bernartice, Královec.

References

Mountain ranges of Poland
Mountain ranges of the Czech Republic
Sudetenland